Konrad Jażdżewski (23 November 1908 in Kluczbork - 21 April 1985 in Łódź) was a Polish professor of archeology, doctor honoris causa at the University of Łódź. He was the first to conduct excavations at Brześć Kujawski.

Publications 
 JAZDZEWSKI, KONRAD. Poland. 240 pp. with 77 photos, 27 line drawings, 3 maps, & 3 tables, 8vo, cloth. New York, Praeger, 1965. Ancient People and Places Series.
 Konrad Jażdżewski, Urgeschichte Mitteleuropas (Wrocław 1984).
 Archaeological Research on course of the new investments - Interstate Highways A-1 and A-2, by foundation of Konrad Jażdżewski Institute of archeology and Anthropology

References

External links
 Bio 
 http://www.uni.lodz.pl/portal/wybitni.php?akcja=pokaz&show=hc30

1908 births
1985 deaths
20th-century Polish archaeologists
People from Kluczbork
Adam Mickiewicz University in Poznań alumni
Academic staff of the University of Łódź